Limavady United Football Club is an intermediate, Northern Irish football club playing in the NIFL Premier Intermediate League. The club comes from Limavady, County Londonderry, and plays home matches at the Showgrounds. Club colours are royal blue shirts with white trim, blue socks and royal blue shorts. Away colours are all yellow. The current manager is Paul Owens.

History
There have been many football clubs in Limavady, dating back to 1880, when Alexander, a founding member of the Irish Football Association was formed by the Alexander Cricket Club. Alexander merged with another local club, Wanderers, in 1884 to form Limavady F.C.. Club historian David Brewster, however, dates the current Limavady club's formation to 1955.

After a long time as a junior team, the club joined the senior Irish Football League in 1997–98, and reached its first Irish Cup semi-final in over a century in 2003–04. In 2008, the club lost its senior status when it failed to gain admission to the new IFA Premiership. Since then, the club played in the IFA Championship until relegation in May 2019.

In April 2013, three players received suspensions after being found guilty of breaching IFA betting rules on one of the club's league matches.

The club won the NIFL Championship 2 in the 2015-2016 season but were denied promotion to NIFL Championship 1 as they were unsuccessful in applying for a licence. However they were promoted as winners of the Premier Intermediate League in 2016-2017

Carlos Tevez loan
In September 2011, the club vice chairman David Brewster issued a fax to Manchester City, offering to take Argentinian International Carlos Tevez on loan after the player had refused to go on as a substitute in a UEFA Champions League fixture. The club offer suggested that they would ensure Tevez stayed match fit and would avoid being cup tied, but asked that City continued to pay his reported £200,000 per week wages, a figure higher than Limavady's entire turnover for a year.

The offer, although meant as tongue in cheek became global headline news with some news agencies believing the offer to be a serious one. The story gained the club brief worldwide recognition although Manchester City themselves did not respond.

Current squad

Honours

Senior honours
County Londonderry Cup/North West Senior Cup: 6
1993–94, 1998–99, 2003–04, 2005–06, 2015–16, 2018–19

Intermediate honours
Irish League B Division: 2
1983–84, 1992–93
NIFL Championship 2: 1
2015–16
NIFL Premier Intermediate League: 1
2016–17

Irish Intermediate Cup: 3
1973–74, 1995–96 , 2016–17
George Wilson Cup: 1
1975–76
Craig Memorial Cup: 9
 1992–93, 1993–94, 1994–95, 2008–09, 2010–11, 2012–13, 2014–15, 2015–16, 2016–17
B Division Knock-out Cup: 2
1992–93, 1995–96

Junior honours
Irish Junior Cup: 1
1963–64
 North West City Cup: 2
1960–61, 1966–67
North West Junior League: 1
1968–69

External links 
 Official Website

References

Association football clubs established in 1955
Association football clubs in Northern Ireland
Limavady
Association football clubs in County Londonderry
1955 establishments in Ireland
NIFL Championship clubs